The 2006 Dodge Charger 500, the 50th running of the event that dates to the 1957 Rebel 300 , was held on May 13, 2006 at Darlington Raceway as the eleventh race of the 2006 NASCAR Nextel Cup season. Kasey Kahne won the pole.

Background 
Darlington Raceway, nicknamed by many NASCAR fans and drivers as "The Lady in Black" or "The Track Too Tough to Tame" and advertised as a "NASCAR Tradition", is a race track built for NASCAR racing located near Darlington, South Carolina. It is of a unique, somewhat egg-shaped design, an oval with the ends of very different configurations, a condition which supposedly arose from the proximity of one end of the track to a minnow pond the owner refused to relocate. This situation makes it very challenging for the crews to set up their cars' handling in a way that will be effective at both ends.

The track, Darlington Raceway,  is a four-turn  oval. The track's first two turns are banked at twenty-five degrees, while the final two turns are banked two degrees lower at twenty-three degrees. The front stretch (the location of the finish line) and the back stretch is banked at six degrees. Darlington Raceway can seat up to 60,000 people.

Qualifying

Race results 
Rookie of the year contenders denoted by *

Failed to qualify: Chad Chaffin (#61), Kenny Wallace (#78), Carl Long (#37), Chad Blount (#34)

References 

Dodge Charger 500
Dodge Charger 500
NASCAR races at Darlington Raceway
May 2006 sports events in the United States